Peter David Tagg is a British drummer, formerly in Cardiacs, and currently in The Trudy.

References

Year of birth missing (living people)
Living people
British male drummers
Cardiacs members